Hexham is a market town in Northumberland, England.

Hexham may also refer to:

Other places
Hexham, New South Wales, a suburb of the Australian city of Newcastle
Hexham, Victoria, a town in Australia
Hexham (UK Parliament constituency), a parliamentary constituency containing the town in Northumberland

People with the surname
Henry Hexham (c. 1585–1650), English military writer
Irving Hexham (born 1943), Canadian academic and writer